= Association of Physicians for Humanism =

- Hangul: 인도주의실천의사협의회
- Hanja: 人道主義實踐醫師協議會
- RR: Indojuui silcheon uisa hyeobuihoe
- MR: Indojuŭi silch'ŏn ŭisa hyŏbŭihoe

The Association of Physicians for Humanism is a non-profit organisation of medical doctors in South Korea founded on 21 November 1987. Chung Hyung-jun is the executive director.

It was established in the aftermath of democratisation and campaigns for people's health and human rights in the Republic of Korea.

In February 2024, the South Korean Government announced that, in response to a shortage of doctors in key areas it would increase the number of medical students by 2000, starting in 2025. The Association of Physicians for Humanism argue that the root of the shortages is that It’s completely up to individual doctors where and how the trained doctors work after training. In this profit-oriented medical environment in Korea, doctors' activities are ultimately concentrated on profit-oriented inessential areas and unreimbursed care that is not covered by health insurance.
